Mads Pieler Kolding (born 27 January 1988) is a Danish badminton player who specializes in doubles. He won the gold medal at the 2016 European Championships in the men's doubles event partnered with Mads Conrad-Petersen. He was also a part of the Denmark national team who won the 2016 Thomas Cup. Kolding announced his retirement from the international badminton on 4 November 2021.

Achievements

European Championships 
Men's doubles

Mixed doubles

European Junior Championships 
Boys' doubles

Mixed doubles

BWF Superseries (3 runners-up) 
The BWF Superseries, which was launched on 14 December 2006 and implemented in 2007, was a series of elite badminton tournaments, sanctioned by the Badminton World Federation (BWF). BWF Superseries levels were Superseries and Superseries Premier. A season of Superseries consisted of twelve tournaments around the world that had been introduced since 2011. Successful players were invited to the Superseries Finals, which were held at the end of each year.

Men's doubles

  BWF Superseries Finals tournament
  BWF Superseries Premier tournament
  BWF Superseries tournament

BWF Grand Prix (6 titles, 1 runner-up) 
The BWF Grand Prix had two levels, the Grand Prix and Grand Prix Gold. It was a series of badminton tournaments sanctioned by the Badminton World Federation (BWF) and played between 2007 and 2017.

Men's doubles

Mixed doubles

  BWF Grand Prix Gold tournament
  BWF Grand Prix tournament

BWF International Challenge/Series (14 titles, 5 runners-up) 
Men's doubles

Mixed doubles

  BWF International Challenge tournament
  BWF International Series tournament

References

External links 
 
 
 

Living people
1988 births
People from Holbæk Municipality
Danish male badminton players
Sportspeople from Region Zealand